Mattilda Bernstein Sycamore is an American author and activist. She is the author of two memoirs and three novels, and the editor of six nonfiction anthologies.

Early life and education
Sycamore was born in Washington, D.C. to a Jewish family and was raised in the Potomac Highlands neighborhood of Rockville, Maryland. After spending a year in college at Brown University, in 1992 she moved to San Francisco where she became involved in activism with ACT UP.

Activism and literary career 
Sycamore was involved in ACT UP in the early 1990s and Fed Up Queers in the late 1990s. In 1998, she was the host of the first Gay Shame event in New York, appearing with performer Penny Arcade, writer Eileen Myles, cabaret artists Kiki and Herb, and queercore band Three Dollar Bill held in Brooklyn, NY, which was captured in the documentary film entitled Gay Shame 98, by Scott Berry. She was one of the instigators of Gay Shame in San Francisco, which started in 2000 and became "a year-round direct action extravaganza dedicated to exposing all hypocrites". Sycamore was involved in the cultural center Dumba, and is a leading critic of assimilationist trends in gay culture.

Sycamore's first anthology, Tricks and Treats: Sex Workers Write About Their Clients, was published by Haworth Press in 2000. Her first novel, Pulling Taffy, was published by Suspect Thoughts Press in 2003. Her second anthology, Dangerous Families: Queer Writing on Surviving, was published by Haworth Press in 2004. Her third anthology, That's Revolting!: Queer Strategies for Resisting Assimilation, was published by Soft Skull Press that same year. Her fourth anthology, Nobody Passes: Rejecting the Rules of Gender and Conformity, was published by Seal Press in 2006.

Her second novel, So Many Ways to Sleep Badly, was published by City Lights Books in 2008. Her fifth anthology, Why Are Faggots So Afraid of Faggots? Flaming Challenges to Masculinity, Objectification, and the Desire to Conform, was published by AK Press in 2012, and was an American Library Association Stonewall Honor Book.

Sycamore's first memoir, The End of San Francisco, was published by City Lights Books in 2013, and won a Lambda Literary Award. Her third novel, Sketchtasy, was published by Arsenal Pulp Press in 2018. Her second memoir, The Freezer Door, was published by Semiotext(e) in 2020, and received rave reviews in The New York Times and The Washington Post on the publication date. The Freezer Door was named one of the Best LGBTQ Books of 2020 by O, The Oprah Magazine, was a New York Times Editors' Choice, and was a finalist for the 2021 PEN/Jean Stein Book Award, an annual award which recognizes a "book-length work of any genre for its originality, merit, and impact, which has broken new ground by reshaping the boundaries of its form and signaling strong potential for lasting influence."

Sycamore's sixth anthology, Between Certain Death and a Possible Future: Queer Writing on Growing Up with the AIDS Crisis, was published by Arsenal Pulp Press in 2021. Her next book, Touching The Art, is scheduled to be published by Soft Skull Press in 2023.

In January 2009, Sycamore initiated a public postering project called Lostmissing, which she describes as:

Sycamore opposed the push among the LGBT movement for same-sex marriage, arguing that it distracts from more pressing issues like the securing of universal health care and housing security for all. Sycamore also opposed the LGBT movement's focus on inclusion in the US military, arguing instead that the movement should be focused on opposing the harmful impacts of the military at home and abroad. In 2010, she appeared on Democracy Now! in the segment Does Opposing “Don’t Ask, Don’t Tell” Bolster US Militarism? A Debate with Lt. Dan Choi and Queer Activist Mattilda Bernstein Sycamore, and later penned op-eds against trans inclusion in the military in Truthout and The Baffler. In 2018, in collaboration with Dean Spade, Sycamore co-organized a Queer Anti-Militarism Townhall: Trans Liberation Not U.S. Invasion at the Seattle Public Library, alongside other queer and trans anti-military voices, including Micha Cárdenas, Soya Jung, Nikkita Oliver and Matt Remle. Sycamore contributed to Against Equality: Queer Critiques of Gay Marriage, and wrote the introduction to Against Equality: Queer Revolution, Not Mere Inclusion, anthologies printed by the Against Equality collective in 2010 and 2014. In 2008, Sycamore was named as a "visionary" as part of Utne Reader magazine's "50 Visionaries Who Are Changing the World."

Awards and honors
 2013 American Library Association Stonewall Honor Book, Why Are Faggots So Afraid of Faggots? Flaming Challenges to Masculinity, Objectification, and the Desire to Conform
2014 Lambda Literary Award for Transgender Non-Fiction, The End of San Francisco 
 2018 NPR Book Concierge Best Books of 2018, Sketchtasy
 2018 Artist Trust Fellowship, writer
 2020 New York Times Editors' Choice, The Freezer Door 
2020 O, The Oprah Magazine Best LGBTQ Books of 2020, The Freezer Door 
 2021 PEN/Jean Stein Book Award Finalist, The Freezer Door

Personal life
Sycamore is genderqueer and uses she/her pronouns. She has described herself as, "A genderqueer, faggot, and a queen, on the trans continuum, in a gender bending, gender blur kind of place. But the words I relate to the most are probably 'faggot' and 'queen.' 'Queer' would be more of a broader political identity."

Bibliography

Novels 

Sketchtasy Vancouver: Arsenal Pulp Press, 2018. , 
So Many Ways to Sleep Badly San Francisco: City Lights Books, 2008. , 
Pulling Taffy San Francisco: Suspect Thoughts, 2003. ,

Memoir 
The Freezer Door South Pasadena: Semiotext(e) 2020.  
The End of San Francisco San Francisco: City Lights Books, 2013. ,

Nonfiction Anthologies 
Between Certain Death and a Possible Future: Queer Writing on Growing Up with the AIDS Crisis Vancouver: Arsenal Pulp Press, 2021. 
Why Are Faggots So Afraid of Faggots? Flaming Challenges to Masculinity, Objectification, and the Desire to Conform Oakland: AK Press, 2012. , 
Nobody Passes: Rejecting the Rules of Gender and Conformity Emeryville: Seal Press, 2006. , 
That's Revolting!: Queer Strategies for Resisting Assimilation Brooklyn: Soft Skull Press: Distributed by Publishers Group West, 2004. , 
Dangerous Families: Queer Writing on Surviving New York: Haworth Press, 2004.
Tricks and Treats: Sex Workers Write About Their Clients New York: Haworth Press, 2000. ,

Filmography
All That Sheltering Emptiness (2010), 16mm, 7 mins

References

External links

An interview with Mattilda Bernstein Sycamore, August 2008 
Does Opposing "Don't Ask, Don't Tell" Bolster US Militarism? – video debate by Democracy Now!
New York Journal of Books review of 2013 title, The End of San Francisco
The Brutality of Believing: Mattilda Bernstein Sycamore in Conversation with Kathleen Rooney. Brooklyn Rail, February 2014

American feminists
People with non-binary gender identities
Living people
Queer feminists
Transfeminists
Postmodern feminists
Lambda Literary Award winners
Non-binary activists
20th-century American writers
21st-century American novelists
LGBT people from Washington, D.C.
People from Rockville, Maryland
Transgender Jews
Queer memoirists
Writers from Washington, D.C.
1973 births
American transgender writers
American non-binary writers